Woodman (1983–2007) was an American-bred Thoroughbred racehorse who raced in Ireland but who is best known as a sire of a number of important racehorses.

A descendant of the great sire Nearco through both his dam, Playmate, and his Champion sire, Mr. Prospector, Woodman was a Champion 2-year-old colt in Ireland but was retired to stud duty after five races. Returned to the United States, he stood at Ashford Stud in Versailles, Kentucky. Among his offspring, Woodman sired:

 Hansel - winner of the 1991 Preakness and Belmont Stakes and American Champion Three-Year-Old Male Horse
 Timber Country -  the 1994 Breeders' Cup Juvenile and Preakness Stakes winner
 Bosra Sham - 1996 European Champion 3-Year-Old Filly whose Group One wins include the British Classic, the 1,000 Guineas, and the Champion Stakes
 Hector Protector - multiple stakes winner in France including three Group Ones at age two in 1990: Grand Critérium, Prix Morny, Prix de la Salamandre plus two more Group Ones at age three in 1991:  Poule d'Essai des Poulains, Prix Jacques Le Marois
 Woodcarver - the 1999 Canadian Champion 3-Year-Old Colt and Queen's Plate winner
 Hawk Wing -  top two-year-old of 2001 in the United Kingdom and Ireland

Woodman was the damsire of Wando, the 2003 Canadian Triple Crown champion, and of Kinsale King, winner of the 2010 Dubai Golden Shaheen.

At age twenty-four, Woodman was humanely euthanized due to the infirmities of old age on July 19, 2007.

References
 Woodman's pedigree and partial racing stats

1983 racehorse births
2007 racehorse deaths
Racehorses bred in Kentucky
Racehorses trained in Ireland
Thoroughbred family 1-x